Italy is a unitary parliamentary republic in Europe with the third largest nominal GDP in the Eurozone and the eighth largest in the world. As an advanced economy the country also has the sixth worldwide national wealth and it is ranked third for its central bank gold reserve. Italy has a very high level of human development and it is sixth in the world for life expectancy. 

The country plays a prominent role in regional and global economic, military, cultural and diplomatic affairs, and it is both a regional power and a great power. Italy is a founding and leading member of the European Union and a member of numerous international institutions, including the UN, NATO, the OECD, the OSCE, the WTO, the G7, G20, the Union for the Mediterranean, the Council of Europe, Uniting for Consensus and many more. As a reflection of its cultural wealth, Italy is home to 54 World Heritage Sites, the most in the world, and is the fifth most visited country.

Largest firms 
This list shows firms in the Fortune Global 500, which ranks firms by 2018 total revenues reported before 31 March 2019. Only the top five firms (if available) are included as a sample.

Notable firms 
This list includes notable companies with primary headquarters located in the country. The industry and sector follow the Industry Classification Benchmark taxonomy. Organizations which have ceased operations are included and noted as defunct.

See also 

 Automotive industry in Italy
 Economy of Italy
List of largest Italian companies
 List of Italian brands
 List of Italian telephone companies

References 

Italy